Jacobs Nunatak is a nunatak on the west side of the MacAlpine Hills, Antarctica, just west of the head of Sylwester Glacier. It was named by the Advisory Committee on Antarctic Names for Willis S. Jacobs, a United States Antarctic Research Program geomagnetist and seismologist at South Pole Station in 1959.

References

Nunataks of Oates Land